Dorothy Healy was an outfielder who played in the All-American Girls Professional Baseball League.

Dorothy appeared in 12 games for the expansion Chicago Colleens in the 1948 season. She hit .122 (5-for-41) with a double, driving in seven runs while scoring two times.

Additional information is incomplete because there are no records available at the time of the request. 

The AAGPBL folded in 1954, but there is a permanent display at the Baseball Hall of Fame and Museum at Cooperstown, New York since November 5, 1988, that honors the girls and the league staff rather than any individual figure.

Sources

All-American Girls Professional Baseball League players
Chicago Colleens players
Date of birth missing
Place of birth missing
Possibly living people
Year of birth missing